The 1980 New York Giants season was the franchise's 56th season in the National Football League. The Giants finished in last place in the National Football Conference East Division with a 4–12 record.

In the 1980 NFL Draft, the Giants selected defensive back Mark Haynes with their first-round pick, which was eighth overall. New York won its opening game of the season against the St. Louis Cardinals, 41–35, behind a five-touchdown performance by quarterback Phil Simms. Four of those touchdown passes were to Earnest Gray, who set a single-game franchise record for touchdown receptions. The Giants lost the following game to Washington by two points, the start of an eight-game losing streak. A Week 10 win over the Dallas Cowboys snapped the streak; a subsequent win over the Green Bay Packers was followed by a pair of defeats. A shoulder injury caused Simms to miss the last three games of the season. Scott Brunner took over as the starting quarterback for those games, during which the Giants went 1–2.

Simms threw for 2,321 yards in his 13 appearances, and had 15 touchdown passes and 19 interceptions. Brunner threw for four touchdowns and had six interceptions. New York's leading rusher was Billy Taylor, who ran for 580 yards and four touchdowns. Gray had a team-leading 10 touchdown receptions during the season, and caught 52 passes for 777 yards. On defense, Mike Dennis led the Giants with five interceptions. Two Giants players, Dave Jennings and Brad Van Pelt, were selected for the 1981 Pro Bowl.

Offseason

NFL Draft

Personnel

Staff

Roster

Schedule 

Note: Intra-division opponents are in bold text.

Season summary

Week 1: at St. Louis Cardinals 

 Source: Pro-Football-Reference.com
    
    
    
    
    
    
    
    
    
    
    
    

 Phil Simms 16/31, 280 Yds
 Earnest Gray 9 Rec, 174 Yds

Week 10 vs Cowboys

Giants' first win against Dallas since 1974

Standings

See also 
 1980 NFL season

References 

New York Giants seasons
New York Giants
New York Giants season
20th century in East Rutherford, New Jersey
Meadowlands Sports Complex